The 2015 USA Outdoor Track and Field Championships were held at Hayward Field, University of Oregon in Eugene, Oregon. Organized by USA Track and Field, the four-day competition took place June 25–28 and served as the national championships in track and field for the United States. The event was held in conjunction with the USA Junior Outdoor Track & Field Championships.

Schedule

Men's results
Key:
.

Men track events

Men field events

Notes
 Remontay McClain 9.82 (+4.9) in the heats; Bromell 9.76 (+3.7), Gay 9.79 (+3.0) in semis

 Winger and Evans had not yet achieved the qualifying standard of 65.00 m. Fourth place Rodney Brown threw 65.04 at the Penn Relays on April 18 and seventh place Chase Madison threw 65.42 on the same day in Rock Island, Illinois. Though neither Winger or Evans reached the standard, Winger qualified for the World Championships by winning the NACAC Championship; Brown will take the third entry into the world championships.

 Dolezal and Crouser had not yet achieved the qualifying standard of 82.00 m. Crouser threw 83.33 m in Portland, Oregon on August 1. Dolezal did not meet the standard, but qualified by winning the NACAC championship. Fourth place Tim Glover, who threw 84.09 m on April 11, would have been the next in line to qualify.

 Because Merritt already has a bye (doubly so), 4th place finisher Bryshon Nellum 45.18 is likely to get the third US entry into the World Championships

 Of the top 3, only Centrowitz had reached the qualifying standard (3:36.20, or 3:53.30 in the mile) before the National Championships. Andrews ran 3:35.82 in Portland, Oregon on July 2; Manzano ran 3:36.16 in Monaco on July 17.

 True, who also qualified in the 10,000 m, had not achieved the qualification standard of 13:23 before the USATF Championships. He ran 13:06.15 in Heusden-Zolder on July 18.

  Since Oliver already holds a bye into the world championships, 4th place finisher Aleec Harris (13.241, .005 ahead of Jeffrey Porter) is likely to get the third US entry into the World Championships.

Women's results
Key:
.

Women track events

Women field events

Notes
 Bowie 10.72 and Carmelita Jeter 10.76 (both +3.2); Gardner 10.79 (+1.5) in semis.  Gardner moves to a tie for #14 on the all-time list
 As of the National Championships, no American has achieved the 14.20 m qualification standard. Orji, with a 14.15 set two weeks earlier at the 2015 NCAA Division I Outdoor Track and Field Championships was ranked the highest worldwide (18th) and might be invited to fill out the world championship field if none of these athletes are able to achieve the standard by August 10. Epps, ranked 21st globally, also has an outside chance.

 Carson did not meet the qualifying standard of 61.00 m, nor did any other Americans.  Consequently, only two Americans were named to the team in this event.

  Since Reese already held a bye into the world championships, Jasmine Todd, who placed 4th with 6.84m (22-5¼ ) +1.2, got the third US entry into the World Championships. Todd also qualified in the 100 meters.

 None of the finalists had achieved the qualifying standard of 1.94m by the time of the National Championships.  The only American to achieve the standard is high schooler Vashti Cunningham who entered and won the Junior National Championship.

 Since Simpson held a bye into the world championships, 4th place finisher Lauren Johnson (4:16.08) also qualified for the World Championships. At the end of the championships, neither Kerri Gallagher or Johnson had run a qualifying time, but both of them met the standard later; Gallagher ran 4:03.56 in Lignano on July 7 to qualify for world championships, while Johnson ran 4:04.17 in Heusden-Zolder on July 18.

 Melville and Michta are the only Americans to achieve the qualifying standard before the National Championships

 Nelvis 12.34 (+1.9) in the prelims puts her as #7 on the all time list

Qualification

The 2015 USA Outdoor Track and Field Championships serve as the qualification meet for United States representatives in international competitions, including the 2015 World Championships in Athletics.  In order to be entered, athletes need to achieve a qualifying standard mark and place in the top 3 in their event.  The United States team, as managed by USATF can also bring a qualified back up athlete in case one of the team members is unable to perform. Area champions (meaning, for North American athletes, gold medalists at the 2015 NACAC Championships) did not need to meet the qualifying standard; NACAC conducted its championships three weeks before the World Championships, thus providing one additional opportunity for qualification.

Additionally, defending World Champions and 2014 Diamond League Champion received byes into the World Championships.

The athletes eligible for a bye are:

Defending World Champions

 LaShawn Merritt - 400 meters
 David Oliver - 110 m hurdles
 Ashton Eaton - Decathlon
 Brianna Rollins - 100 m hurdles
 Brittney Reese - Long jump

Diamond League Champions

 Justin Gatlin - 100 meters
 LaShawn Merritt - 400 meters (already qualified as World Champion)
 Michael Tinsley - 400 m hurdles
 Christian Taylor - Triple jump
 Reese Hoffa - Shot put
 Allyson Felix - 200 meters
 Jennifer Simpson - 1500 meters

Not eligible for a bye because the Diamond League Champion cannot displace a World Champion
 Dawn Harper-Nelson - 100 m hurdles
 Tianna Bartoletta - Long jump

Both qualified by winning their respective events in the championships.

References

Results
USATF Championships - 6/25/2015 to 6/28/2015 Hayward Field, Eugene, Ore. Results. USATF. Retrieved on 2015-07-05.

Daily reports
Chavez, Chris (2015-06-26). Carter and Dendy shine on first day of US Championships. IAAF. Retrieved on 2015-06-27.
Chavez, Chris (2015-06-27). Kynard soars to second US title, Nelvis flies to 12.34. IAAF. Retrieved on 2015-06-27.

USA Outdoor Track and Field Championships
USA Outdoors
Track, Outdoor
Sports in Eugene, Oregon
USA Outdoor Track and Field Championships
Track and field in Oregon